Gavrilovskoye is a rural locality (a selo) in Seletskoye Rural Settlement, Suzdalsky District, Vladimir Oblast, Russia. The population was 980 as of 2010. There are 11 streets.

Geography 
Gavrilovskoye is located 14 km southwest of Suzdal (the district's administrative centre) by road. Semyonovskoye-Sovetskoye is the nearest rural locality.

References 

Rural localities in Suzdalsky District
Suzdalsky Uyezd